Anhui Agricultural University (AAU) is a key university in Hefei, the capital city of Anhui, China. AAU is a long history specializing in agriculture and forestry. It is jointly funded by Anhui Provincial Government and the Ministry of Agriculture and Rural Affairs of the PRC.

History

The origin of the university dates back to 1928, when Anhui University was founded in Anqing.

In 1935, AAU started its history as a college of agriculture under Anhui University.

In December 1949, Anhui University moved from Anqing to Wuhu.

In July 1950, July 1952, September 1952, and the summer of 1953, Anhui University conducted three adjustments. After the adjustments, including Anhui University majored in agriculture and forestry professional and specialty of normal school two.

In February 1954, the Agricultural College of Anhui University moved independently to Anhui Agricultural College. It became an independent institution. In April, Anhui Agricultural College moved to Hefei.

In December 1968, Anhui Agricultural College moved to rural education, and split into three campuses: Suxian Zilu lake purple campus, Chuxian campus and Fengyang campus.

In 1970, Anhui Agricultural College recruited the first batch of the worker peasant soldier students. From 1970 to 1977, 2,731 peasants and soldiers students enrolled.

In October 1978, Anhui Agricultural College moved back to Hefei.

In 1995, Anhui Agricultural College changed its name to Anhui Agricultural University.

Schools
School of Animal Science
School of Agronomy
School of Continuing Education (SCE)
School of Economics and Management
School of Engineering
School of Foreign Languages
School of Forestry and Landscape
School of Horticulture
School of Humanities and Social Sciences
School of Information and Computer Science
School of Life Science
School of Textile Engineering 
School of Plant Protection  
School of Resources and Environment (SRE) 
School of Natural Sciences
School of Tea and Food Science  
School of Marxism

Research
AAU has one national key discipline in process and 19 provincial key disciplines.

AAU has one state key laboratory, one national engineering laboratory, one international joint laboratory, and 37 provincial key laboratories, two provincial "2011" collaborative innovation centers, one provincial key think tank, and one provincial research institute of industrial technology.

See also
 List of universities in China

External links
Website of AHAU

 
Agricultural universities and colleges in China
Educational institutions established in 1954
Universities and colleges in Hefei
1954 establishments in China